This article contains the filmography of Yuen Biao.

Film

Television series

All television appearances were broadcast in Hong Kong by TVB unless otherwise stated.

References

Yuen Biao
Yuen Biao